Marie Bergman (born 21 November 1950) is a Swedish singer. Between 1969 and 1972, she was a member in the pop group Family Four, which represented Sweden at the Eurovision Song Contest in 1971 and 1972. She started her solo career in 1974. She has during the years released 13 own-written records and 2 jazz albums and has received numerous awards. In 1994 she again represented Sweden at the Eurovision, this time with Roger Pontare, setting a record as the singer who has represented Sweden at the ESC the most times. This was equalled by Carola Häggkvist in 2006. Marie has performed at the Roskilde Festival four times.

References

External links

 

Swedish women singers
1950 births
Eurovision Song Contest entrants for Sweden
Eurovision Song Contest entrants of 1971
Eurovision Song Contest entrants of 1972
Eurovision Song Contest entrants of 1994
Melodifestivalen winners
Living people
Singers from Stockholm
20th-century Swedish women singers
Melodifestivalen contestants of 2015
Melodifestivalen contestants of 1994
Melodifestivalen contestants of 1971